Neomariania rebeli is a species of moth of the Stathmopodidae family. It is found in Portugal (including Madeira) and on the Canary Islands.

The wingspan is 8–14 mm. Adults have been collected from mid-July to mid-October.

References

External links
Lepiforum e. V.

Stathmopodidae
Moths described in 1894